Relient K is the debut studio album by American rock band Relient K. Many of the tracks are newer versions of those found on their 1998 demo All Work & No Play. Typical of early Relient K albums, the lyrics use pop culture references for teaching and to illustrate Biblical principles. As of late 2006/early 2007, this album has sold around 400,000 copies.

Track listing

Personnel 
Relient K
 Matt Thiessen – lead vocals, guitar
 Matt Hoopes – guitar, backing vocals
 Brian Pittman – bass guitar
 Stephen Cushman – drums, backing vocals

Production
 Todd Collins – executive producer 
 Joey Elwood – executive producer 
 Toby McKeehan – executive producer 
 Mark Lee Townsend – producer, recording 
 Russ Long – mixing at The Carport (Nashville, Tennessee)
 Erik Wolf – mastering at Wolf Mastering (Nashville, Tennessee)
 Mike McGlaflin – A&R 
 Kerri McKeehan-Stuart – photography 
 Brad Talbott – design, layout 
 Timothy Eddings – management

Notes and miscellanea
At the end of "Hello McFly", Toby McKeehan (tobyMac) calls Matt Thiessen, telling him that a song about Marilyn Manson will never be on a CD put out by Gotee Records (the call is followed by "My Girlfriend", a song about Marilyn Manson). McKeehan is the president of Gotee Records, and the one who signed Relient K to a record deal after hearing their demo.
 The hidden track after "K Car" is entitled "Punk Rock Picnic" - Relient K's "Call Us Rock Stars" with various quotes dubbed over and then music from a polka concert at the end.
 The song "anchorage" is the only Relient K song to begin with a lowercase letter, and is the first Relient K song that has absolutely no vocals.
 Pre-release copies of the album feature a short track called "Ed Sullivan" which was excluded from the release version, likely due to licensing issues, as it is in fact a brief parody of the same song from the film Bye Bye Birdie.
 In the song "K Car", the line, "and Brandon Ebel just gave us a call", references the founder of the Christian record label Tooth & Nail Records.
 Drummer Stephen Cushman provides the screaming vocals on "Softer to Me", as well as some lead vocals on "Wake Up Call".

Pop culture and Biblical references 
"Hello McFly" refers to the Back to the Future trilogy, in which the main character was named Marty McFly.  The song is about the inability to change one's past.
"Charles in Charge" was a cover of the theme from the TV series of the same name.
"17 Magazine" refers to the magazine of the same name.
"Nancy Drew" refers to the series of children's mysteries with the main character of the same name.  This song also mentions The Hardy Boys, the brother series to Nancy Drew.
"K Car" refers to Plymouth's Reliant K, based on the K Car platform, for which the band is named.
At the end of the polka music that makes up the second half of the hidden track, the man playing that just finished playing the polka music asks the audience if they've heard his song on the radio about the Cleveland Browns. It also features a recording of a Reliant K starting up in the intro.
"My Girlfriend" draws parallels to 1 Peter , where the Devil is portrayed as a Lion waiting to devour lives.  It also references rocker Marilyn Manson and his song "The Beautiful People".

References

Relient K albums
2000 debut albums
Gotee Records albums
Albums produced by Mark Lee Townsend